Olaf Sørensen (3 August 1892 – 1 August 1962) was a Norwegian politician for the Labour Party.

He was elected to the Norwegian Parliament from the Market towns of Buskerud county in 1945, and was re-elected on two occasions.

Sørensen was born in Kongsberg and held various positions in Kongsberg city council between 1922 and 1959, except for a period between 1940 and 1945 during the German occupation of Norway. He served briefly as mayor in 1945.

References

1892 births
1962 deaths
Labour Party (Norway) politicians
Members of the Storting
20th-century Norwegian politicians
People from Kongsberg